Corsie is a surname. Notable people with the surname include:

 Rachel Corsie (born 1989), Scottish footballer
 Richard Corsie (born 1966), Scottish bowls player

See also
 Corsi (surname)